The Good Album is the fifth studio album from Christian rock band All Star United. It was originally released exclusively on iTunes and online in 2009. On January 12, 2010, the album was released to retail stores under the label E1 Entertainment. This is All Star United's first release with E1 Entertainment.

Track listing
 "Surface Of The Sun" (3:25)
 "Is This The Moment?" (3:51)
 "The Blame" (2:45)
 "Lights Out" (2:10)
 "Once Again, With Feeling" (3:21)
 "Crashing Cars" (2:34)
 "Dude... That's Freaking Awesome!" (4:36)
 "Pretty Famous" (2:51)
 "Good Luck With The Girls" (2:42)
 "I'm A Killer" (3:34)
 "Good Times" (3:47)
 "Beautiful Way" (2:38)

References

2010 albums
All Star United albums